The 1914 Chattanooga Moccasins football team, located in the American city of Chattanooga, Tennessee, represented the University of Chattanooga during the 1914 college football season. It was the football program's seventh year of intercollegiate college football. The team was part of the Southern Intercollegiate Athletic Association and completed its nine-game schedule with a record of 5–4.

Schedule

References

Chattanooga
Chattanooga Mocs football seasons
Chattanooga Moccasins football